Yu Chol-u(유철우) (born 8 August 1959) is the current Director of the North Korean National Aerospace Development Administration.

See also
Politics of North Korea

References

Space program of North Korea
Living people
1959 births
Place of birth missing (living people)
21st-century North Korean people